Lipochaeta is a genus of new world shore flies in the Ephydridae family. Only two species are part of this genus:

 Lipochaeta slossonae Coquillett, 1896, found in the Eastern United States and Central America
 Lipochaeta ranica Mathis and Trautwein, 2003, found in California and North Mexico.

References 

 
Brachycera genera